The Nathan Hills are a series of hills in the east part of the Arrowhead Range of the Southern Cross Mountains, in Victoria Land. Named by the southern party of New Zealand Geological Survey Antarctic Expedition (NZGSAE), 1966–67, for Simon Nathan, senior geologist with this party. The hills are part of the Melbourne Volcanic Province of the McMurdo Volcanic Group. K–Ar or Rb–Sr dating has given a dubious age of 18.5 ± 0.7 million years for Nathan Hills olivine basalt.

References

Hills of Victoria Land
Borchgrevink Coast
Volcanoes of Victoria Land